Rudolf Hübner (born 20 May 1944) is a Czech athlete. He competed in the men's high jump at the 1968 Summer Olympics.

His wife was Miloslava Rezková, a Czech athlete.

References

1944 births
Living people
Athletes (track and field) at the 1968 Summer Olympics
Czech male high jumpers
Olympic athletes of Czechoslovakia
Athletes from Prague